The women's 200 metres event at the 1951 Pan American Games was held at the Estadio Monumental in Buenos Aires on 4 and 5 March.

Medalists

Results

Heats
Held on 4 March

Semifinals
Held on 4 March

Final
Held on 5 March

References

Athletics at the 1951 Pan American Games
1951